Nargeslu-ye Olya (also Romanized as Nargeslū-ye ‘Olyā; also known as Nargeslū-ye Bālā and Nārgeslū Bala) is a village in Badranlu Rural District, in the Central District of Bojnord County, North Khorasan Province, Iran. At the 2006 census, its population was 237, in 65 families.

References 

Populated places in Bojnord County